Rangarajanis a Tamil last name and may refer to

 C. Rangarajan, economist (Former Governor of the Reserve Bank of India)
 G. N. Rangarajan, film director
 Mahesh Rangarajan, author and historian
 Manakkal Rangarajan, Carnatic singer
 Ra. Ki. Rangarajan, writer
 S. Rangarajan, journalist
 Sujatha Rangarajan, writer
 Rangarajan Kumaramangalam, politician
 Sudhangan, journalist and editor also known by his birth name Rangarajan